The Kit-Cat Klock is an art deco novelty wall clock shaped like a grinning cat with cartoon eyes that swivel in time with its pendulum tail. It is traditionally black, but models in other colors and styles are available. It is an iconic symbol of kitchens in pop culture.

The first clock was an idea Earl Arnault (1904 – 1971) and then created and physically prototyped by Clifford Stone (1908-1986) in 1932 and made by the Allied Manufacturing Company, which was owned by Stone, in Portland, Oregon.  Allied subsequently moved to Seattle, Washington, in the early 1940s and then to southern California in 1962, whereupon it was renamed California Clock Company. The clock's design has changed little in the intervening years, with the first generation, manufactured from the 1930s–early 1950s having two paws and no bow tie, and newer models having four paws and a bow tie. In the 1960s genuine crystals were added as accents to some clocks.  The words "Kit-Cat" were added to the clock's face in 1982. The original clocks were AC-powered, but due to scarcity of American-made AC motors, the clock was redesigned for battery power in the late 1980s. The manufacturer estimates that an average of one clock has been sold every three minutes for the last 50 years.

Kit-Cat Klocks are frequently seen in movies, commercials, TV and advertising. Several other animated clocks made by the California Clock Company, an owl and a poodle, are shown next to Kit-Cat in this sequence.

The name "Kit-Cat" is a trademark of California Clock Company.

See also
 
 Black cat

References

External links
 Kit-Cat Klock vendor's site
 Kit-Cat Klock Canadian redistributor
 Kit-Cat Klock UK redistributor

Clock designs
Art Deco
Products introduced in 1932
Cats in popular culture
Novelty items